The Munch Bunch is a series of children's books, created in the UK by Barrie and Elizabeth Henderson. The books were written under the pen name Giles Reed by Barrie Henderson, Elizabeth Henderson, and British author Denis Bond, and illustrated by Angela Mitson. They were published between 1979 and 1984 by Studio Publications (Ipswich) Ltd. in the United Kingdom. United States publication rights were sold to Rourke Publications, Inc. The Munch Bunch are a group of unwanted vegetables, fruits, legumes and nuts who were swept to the corner of a shop but ran away together and set up home in and around an old, forgotten garden shed.

Television series

There was also an early 1980s marionette/puppet-based television show, produced by long-time Gerry Anderson associates Mary Turner and John Read for ITC Entertainment, that featured the characters from the books.

The stories for the television series were different from those contained in the books and were written mainly by Bond (this time under his real name), though other writers such as Rosemary Kingsland also contributed.

The characters in the series were voiced by the veteran husband-and-wife team of Judy Bennett and Charles Collingwood, well best known for their work in The Archers. 52 ten-minute editions were produced, thus originally airing between September 1980 and May 1982. The show was also broadcast in Hong Kong on TVB Pearl and New Zealand on TV One. 

Series 1: 12 editions, first shown from 24 September 1980
Series 2: 13 editions, first shown from 25 March 1981
Series 3: 21 editions, first shown from 30 September 1981
Series 4: 6 editions, first shown from 7 April 1982

Deletion of the Munch Bunch 

The books went out of print in the mid-to-late 1980s following a fire at a Studio Publications which destroyed all the original artwork.

Yoghurt
The Munch Bunch yoghurt brand was launched circa 1981 to coincide with the launch of the television series, with Mitson's characters as well as a few non-book characters such as Jenny Cherry and Charlie Chocolate but by the 1990s had struck out completely in their own right retaining only the logo and a few character names.

The brand had a resurgence in the UK during the 1990s, largely as a result of a popular TV commercial for the Munch Bunch "pot shots" range (a petits-filous type yoghurt aimed at the young) set in a pool hall, which ran from May 1994 until February 1996. This popularity proved short-lived, and only three of the Munch Bunch characters were featured in the "pot shots" range.

A completely different series of Munch Bunch books was published in 1998 by Ladybird Books in the UK to tie in with the yoghurts, following the resurgence brought about by the TV commercials of 1994–96. Denis Bond and Angela Mitson were not involved and the characters were different, although a few such as Sally Strawberry were similarly named.

The Munch Bunch yoghurt brand name continues to this day under the Nestlé umbrella: however, the "fruit and veg" characters have been superseded by a "cow" mascot named Munch.

Original character series 1979-82

Aubrey Aubergine
Adam Avocado
The Banana Bunch
Barnabus Beetroot
Billy Blackberry
Bounce (spring onion)
Button and Tiny (mushrooms)
Casper Carrot
Chunky Pineapple
Corky Coconut
Corny-on-the-Cob
Dick Turnip
Emma Apple
Lizzie Leek
Lucy Lemon
Merv Marrow
Nurse Plum
Olive
Olly Onion
Peanut
Pedro Orange
Pete Pepper
Penny Parsnip
Percy Prune
Pippa Pear
Professor Peabody
Rory Rhubarb
Rozzy Raspberry
Runner Bean
Sally Strawberry
Scruff Gooseberry
Spud (Potato)
Supercool (cucumber)
Suzie Celery
Tom Tomato
Wally Walnut

US character name differences

Aubrey Aubergine - Eddie Eggplant
Barnabus Beetroot - Barnabus Beet
Merv Marrow - Zack Zucchini

1979 group 'Munch Bunch' book series

Meet the Munch Bunch
The Munch Bunch at the Seaside
The Munch Bunch Have a Party
The Munch Bunch Go Camping
The Munch Bunch Welcomes New Friends (1982)

1983 series

Pete Pepper's Trip to the Zoo
Casper Carrot's Big Mistake
Lucy Lemon and the Birthday Post
Aubrey Aubergine and the Grandfather Clock
Spud's Sports Day
Adam Avocado and the Picnic Basket
Barnabus Beetroot's Blue Umbrella
Penny Parsnip Starts a School
The Banana Bunch Have Half a Holiday
Button and Tiny Buy Bicycles
Nurse Plum's Busy Week
Peanut Goes to the Circus
Emma Apple's Jumble Sale (1985)

1984 series

Spud and the Big Red Balloon
Sally Strawberry and the Painted Snake
Olly Onion's Fancy Dress Party
Casper Carrot's New Blue Jumper
Dick Turnip and the Crazy Clowns
Rozzy Raspberry's Wallpaper Machine
Billy Blackberry's Secret Tunnel
Corny-on-the-Cob's Not so Funny Day
Rory Rhubarb and the River Monster
Merv Marrow's New Police Car
Scruff Gooseberry and the Wishing Well
Emma Apple's Late Birthday Party

New Zealand character series 1985

Charlie Kumara
Kiri Kiwifruit
Patty Passionfruit
Ted Tamarillo

Yoghurt tie-in series 1998

Andy Apricot
Barney Banana
Bertie Blackcurrant
Ollie Orange
Rozzy Raspberry (different character though identically named)
Sally Strawberry (different character though identically named)

See also

The Garden Gang

References

External links
The Munch Bunch TV series at the IMDb
The Munch Bunch TV series intro for download (TVARK)
The Munch Bunch TV series intro online (YouTube)
The Munch Bunch TV series closing credits for download (TVARK)

British picture books
ITV children's television shows
Television series by ITC Entertainment
1979 children's books
1980 British television series debuts
1982 British television series endings
1980s British children's television series
British television shows based on children's books
British television shows featuring puppetry
English-language television shows
TVNZ 1 original programming
Fruit and vegetable characters
Series of children's books